The members of the Westminster Assembly of Divines, sometimes known collectively as the Westminster Divines, are those clergymen who participated in the Assembly that drafted the Westminster Confession of Faith. The Long Parliament's initial ordinance creating the Westminster Assembly appointed 121 ministers of the Church of England to the Assembly, as well as providing for participation on the part of 30 lay assessors (10 nobles and 20 commoners), as well as six Commissioners representing the Church of Scotland. Of the original 121 divines, approximately 25 never took their seats in the Assembly. The Parliament subsequently added 21 additional ministers to the Assembly (the additions being known to history as the Superadded Divines) to replace those ministers who did not attend, or who had died or become ill since the calling of the Assembly.

Note: In the list below, members of the Assembly without dates beside their names are mainly Royalists who did not take their seats in the Assembly because King Charles I instructed all loyal subjects not to participate in the Westminster Assembly.

Divines

Lay Assessors

Nobles

Commoners

Scottish Commissioners

Ministers

Elders

References

William Maxwell Hetherington, History of the Westminster Assembly of Divines (1853) (List is in Chapter 2)
List of Westminster Divines from the Westminster Assembly Project

Notes